The 1992–93 Wessex Football League was the seventh season of the Wessex Football League. The league champions for the first time were AFC Lymington. There was no promotion to the Southern League this season, but founder members Romsey Town were relegated.

For sponsorship reasons, the league was known as the Jewson Wessex League.

League table
The league consisted of one division of 21 clubs, increased from 19 the previous season after two new clubs joined:
Gosport Borough, relegated from the Southern League.
Whitchurch United, joining from the Hampshire League.

References

Wessex Football League seasons
9